Scenopinus fenestralis, the window fly, is a member of the Scenopinidae family of flies, found in Europe, including Central Europe and Southern England. It is somewhat inactive, small and black, and tends to be found resting on the windows of old buildings and outhouses. Its larvae are notable for feeding on the larvae of clothes moths and fleas, though they also eat other insects.

References

External links 
 House Windowfly (Scenopinus fenestralis), Wild About Denmark

Scenopinidae
Asilomorph flies of Europe
Flies described in 1758
Taxa named by Carl Linnaeus